HMS Grampus (N56) was the lead ship of her class of mine-laying submarine of the Royal Navy. She was built at Chatham Dockyard and launched on 25 February 1936. She served in World War II off China before moving to the Mediterranean Sea. She was sunk with all hands by the Regia Marina on 16 June 1940.

On 16 June 1940, under the command of Lieutenant Commander C. A. Rowe, Grampus laid mines in the Syracuse and Augusta, Sicily area. Within a very short time, Grampus was destroyed. Wreckage came to the surface along with air bubbles and oil. Polluce was credited with the kill. There were no survivors. Some sources give the date of this action as 24 June 1940.

Notes

References

External links
 HMS Grampus from uboat.net

 

Grampus-class submarines
Ships built in Chatham
1936 ships
World War II submarines of the United Kingdom
Lost submarines of the United Kingdom
World War II shipwrecks in the Mediterranean Sea
Maritime incidents in June 1940
Ships lost with all hands
Submarines sunk by Italian warships